Bangladesh Madrasah Education Board or Alia Madrasah Education Board started its activity independently in 1979. With the passage of time in Bangladeshi madrasah education several amendments have come to pass. In 1978 humanities and science faculties were included at the Alim level. In 1980 Fazil degrees were granted the same standard of education as Higher Secondary School Certificate (HSC) degrees but this was changed in later years with Dakhil level having the equivalency of Secondary School Certificate (SSC) since 1985, and Alim being considered as the HSC equivalent since 1987.

Humanities, science, business and technical education has been included with madrasah education. Meanwhile, a law has been passed for Fazil and Kamil levels to be considered equivalent with bachelor's and master's degrees in general education.

Background
Alia Madrasah was established in Calcutta in 1780 by the East India Company through Headteacher Majduddin and this later formed the Madrasah Education Board of Bengal. Madrasah education was then started formally. Late A. K. Fazlul Huq the prime minister declared in a prize giving ceremony is Kolkata Alia Madrasah in 1939, "I want the spread of Madrasah Education should be modernized and an Islamic Arabic University should be established".

To materialize this declaration of share-E-Bangla a committee named Moula Box was formed. This committee advises on the development of madrasah education. In 1947 after the independence of Pakistan many commissions were formed for the development of madrasah education. Among them in 1949 the "West Bengal Educational System Reconstruction Committee" was formed and in 1963-64 the name of Arabic University was mentioned.

In '1971' after the independence of Bangladesh, steps were taken for the modernization of madrasah education. Bengali, mathematics, English, social science, general science were made compulsory. In 1978 the Madrasah Education Board was formed under Ordinance for the Modernization of Madrasah Education. The board has faced difficulties in recruiting teachers for science related classes. In 2017 Bangladesh government removed references to Jihad from books of Madrasah Education Board.

See also
 Qawmi
 Education in Bangladesh
 Al-Haiatul Ulya Lil-Jamiatil Qawmia Bangladesh
 Bangladesh Qawmi Madrasah Education Board
 Islam in Bangladesh
 Religious education
 Charity school
 List of Islamic seminaries

References 

Educational institutions established in 1979
Education Board in Bangladesh
1979 establishments in Bangladesh
Madrasas in Bangladesh